Amado Medina Lara (born 11 November 1946) is a Mexican rower. He competed in the men's coxed eight event at the 1968 Summer Olympics.

Notes

References

External links
 

1946 births
Living people
Mexican male rowers
Olympic rowers of Mexico
Rowers at the 1968 Summer Olympics
Rowers from Mexico City